Margaret Adams is the name of:

 Margaret Q. Adams (1874–1974), first woman deputy sheriff in the United States
 Margaret Adams (pilot), Australian aviator